Candler School of Theology is one of seven graduate schools at Emory University, located in metropolitan Atlanta, Georgia. A university-based school of theology, Candler educates ministers, scholars of religion and other leaders. It is also one of 13 seminaries affiliated with the United Methodist Church.

Mission Statement 
Candler School of Theology is grounded in the Christian faith and shaped by the Wesleyan tradition of evangelical piety, ecumenical openness, and social concern. Its mission as a university-based school of theology is to educate—through scholarship, teaching, and service—faithful and creative leaders for the church's ministries throughout the world.

History

In March 1914, the Methodist Episcopal Church, South (MECS) and Vanderbilt University, a flagship institution of higher education for the church, severed ties. MECS appointed an Educational Commission to establish a university in the Southeast that would be a place where pastors-in-training at Vanderbilt could continue their education by the fall.

Asa Candler, founder of The Coca-Cola Company and brother of commission chair Warren Candler, promised one million dollars for the endowment of the southeastern university. The commission voted unanimously to locate it in Atlanta.

Emory College in Oxford, Georgia, agreed to become the undergraduate division of the university and the university was given the name Emory University in recognition of the college's history.

In September 1914, the theology school began instruction at Wesley Memorial Church, moving to the Druid Hills campus in 1916. In 1915, the Emory University trustees voted to name the theology school Candler, though the meeting minutes don’t indicate definitively whether the name is in honor of Warren or Asa Candler.

In 1922, Candler faculty elected to offer admission to female students, despite the fact that the Methodist Episcopal Church, South did not offer a path to ordination for women. It wasn’t until 1938 that Mary Vaughn Johnson became the first woman to be awarded Emory's bachelor of divinity degree.

The United States’ involvement in World War II decreased enrollment at Candler, and focused the school's training of remaining students for military chaplaincy, a vocation that half of the graduating class of 1943 pursued. Kiyoshi Tanimoto, a 1940 graduate of Candler, was serving a Methodist church in Hiroshima when the atomic bomb is dropped. Tanimoto later devoted his life to helping the survivors and speaking out for nuclear disarmament.

Despite the U.S. Supreme Court's Brown v. Board of Education decision in 1954, Georgia resisted attempts at racial integration. In 1957, 80 white religious leaders signed what became known as the “Ministers’ Manifesto” calling for an end to segregation in the city's schools. A year later, Atlanta newspapers published another open letter from Emory faculty and administrators reiterating the need to integrate the public schools; nearly the entire theology faculty signed the letter. In 1965, Candler's first black student, Otis Turner, enrolled.

In 1971, Charles Gerkin led the design of a three-year program of supervised ministry as a curriculum requirement. In addition to field placements at sites ranging from hospitals and homeless shelters to local churches, the program also included time for reflection seminars led by faculty. This program came to be known as Contextual Education, or ConEd.

In 1974, the Anglican Studies program began. Later renamed Episcopal Studies, the program is the oldest university-based Episcopal ministry education program in the country.

In 1975, Candler librarian Channing Jeschke persuaded Dean James T. Laney to purchase the Hartford Theological Seminary library collection, which grew the library's holdings from 90,000 volumes to more than 300,000. That same year, the theology building began renovations to serve as a library for the new collection. In 1976, the building was renamed Pitts Theology Library in recognition of Margaret Pitts and her father, William I.H. Pitts, and the Pitts Foundation's assistance in purchasing the Hartford collection.

In 1978, Roberta C. Bondi became the first female faculty member on the tenure track of the theology school. Though Candler had employed female visiting professors and untenured lecturers, Bondi's appointment marked the first time a woman was officially on faculty.

That same year, Paul Rudolph was retained to design a new chapel, and in 1979, U.S. President Jimmy Carter presided over the groundbreaking of Cannon Chapel, named in honor of former dean William R. Cannon.

In 1990, Robert M. Franklin, Jr. launched Candler's Black Church Studies Program. Franklin later would become president of Morehouse College and returned to Candler in 2014 as the inaugural James T. and Berta R. Laney Chair of Moral Leadership.

In 1991, the Program in Women's Studies was launched under part-time director Kris Kvam; it would later be renamed the Program for Women in Theology and Ministry. That same year, Nancy Ammerman founded Candler's Baptist Studies Program.

In 2007, Jan Love became Candler's first female dean.

Candler School of Theology observed its centennial in the 2014-15 academic year with a series of events that acknowledged Candler's contributions to theological education and to the church during the past 100 years; its role within and contribution to Emory University during the past 100 years; its vision for addressing the challenges and opportunities facing theology in the 21st century; and the accomplishments of Candler's faculty, alumni and friends/donors.

Three members of the faculty are fellows of the American Academy of Arts and Sciences: E. Brooks Holifield, Carol A. Newsom, and Carl R. Holladay.

Academics

Degrees and Accreditation
Candler School of Theology has been accredited by the Association of Theological Schools in the United States and Canada (ATS) since 1938. In addition, Emory University is accredited by the Commission on Colleges of the Southern Association of Colleges and Schools to award degrees at the associate, bachelor's, master's and doctoral levels.
 Master of Divinity (M.Div.)
 Master of Religious Leadership (MRL)
 Master of Religion and Public Life (MRPL)
 Master of Theological Studies (MTS)
 Master of Theology (Th.M.)
 Doctor of Ministry (D.Min.)

Candler School of Theology offers dual degrees in Bioethics, Business, Development Practice, Law, and Public Health with other graduate schools at Emory University, and a dual degree in Social Work with the University of Georgia (UGA).

Contextual Education 
Candler School of Theology's Contextual Education program integrates coursework, supervised field experience and pastor-led reflection groups. Master of Divinity students are required to fulfill placements in both clinical or social ministry settings in their first year and in ecclesial settings their second year.

International- and U.S.-Based Study 
Candler School of Theology students may participate in academic programs at international and domestic theological institutions, including The General Theological Seminary, New York City; the National Capital Semester for Seminarians, Washington, D.C.; Universidade Metodista de São Paulo (Methodist University of São Paulo), Brazil; University of Helsinki, Finland; Georg-August Universität, Germany; Ludwig-Maximilian-Universität (LMU), Germany; Kwame Nkrumah University of Science and Technology, Ghana; St. Paul's University, Kenya; Methodist Theological University (MTU), Korea; Seminario Evangélico de Puerto Rico, Puerto Rico; University of St. Andrew, St Mary's College, School of Divinity, Scotland; Trinity Theological College, Singapore; University of KwaZulu Natal, South Africa; University College Stockholm, Sweden; Wesley House – University of Cambridge, United Kingdom; and Africa University, Zimbabwe.

Programs

Baptist Studies 
Candler School of Theology's Baptist Studies program prepares students for ordination in the Baptist Church. Candler students enrolled in the Master of Divinity (MDiv) degree program may earn a certificate in Baptist Studies.

Black Church Studies 
Candler School of Theology's Black Church Studies program prepares students for leadership in black and multiracial churches; and teaches the origins, development and contemporary diversity of the black church tradition. Candler students enrolled in the Master of Divinity or Master of Theological Studies degree programs may earn a certificate in Black Church Studies. In addition, the program sponsors events and lectures on black religious life, including the Howard Thurman Lecture, the Anna Julia Cooper Lecture, and the Sankofa Scholar program.

Episcopal Studies 
Candler School of Theology's Episcopal Studies program prepares students for ministry in The Episcopal Church and all the churches in the Anglican Communion. Candler students enrolled in the Master of Divinity degree program who are preparing for ordained parish ministry under the supervision of a bishop may earn a certificate in Episcopal Studies.

Methodist Studies 
Candler School of Theology's Methodist Studies program offers a range of courses in Methodist studies, stewards denominational and conference relations, mentors candidates seeking ordination and organizes denominational activities.

Religious Education Ministries 
Candler School of Theology's Religious Education Ministries program prepares students for educational leadership in congregations, schools and communities. Candler students enrolled in the Master of Divinity, Master of Religious Leadership or Master of Theological Studies degree programs may earn a certificate in Religious Education Ministries. In addition, the program partners with the Youth Theological Initiative.

Women, Theology, and Ministry 
Candler School of Theology's Women, Theology, and Ministry program educates women and men to be leaders and advocates for the well being of girls and women in the church and in the world. Candler students enrolled in the Master of Divinity or Master of Theological Studies degree programs may earn a certificate in Women, Theology, and Ministry. In addition, the program sponsors lectures, events and networking opportunities.

Continuing Education 
Candler School of Theology offers continuing education for individuals not enrolled in a degree program through Candler course auditing, seminars, certifications and other theology courses.

United Methodist Course of Study 
The Course of Study School at Emory educates and trains local pastors in The United Methodist Church, and is sponsored by The United Methodist Church, the General Board of Higher Education and Ministry, the Southeastern Jurisdictional Administrative Council, and Candler School of Theology.

Pitts Theology Library 

Pitts Theology Library, one of six instructional libraries at Emory University, holds a distinguished collection of theological materials.

With over 610,000 volumes, the library collection consists primarily of materials related to the development of Christian history and thought. The library also acquires materials in contiguous areas that are related to the history of other religious traditions (especially early Judaism), the interpretation of Jewish and Christian scriptures (e.g., historical and philological works related to the ancient Near East, Greece, and Rome), the history of Christianity (e.g., political and social history of the lands in which Christianity spread), the development of Christian theology (e.g., philosophy, ethics, literature), and the practice of Christian life and ministry (e.g., music, sociology, psychology). While most materials collected are in English, German, French, and Latin, materials in other languages are also acquired as necessary.

The Pitts Library subscribes to more than 1,100 periodicals, with special strength in titles from sub-Saharan Africa, and typically adds over 7,000 volumes to its collections annually. The Special Collections of the library are extensive, including over 130,000 rare or special books and nearly 2,500 linear feet of unpublished archival materials. These collections include:
 Over 3,500 books and several rare manuscripts documenting the history of the Protestant Reformation in Germany to 1570,
 About 11,000 early North European theological dissertations,
 About 15,000 works of English and American hymnody and psalmody,
 Over 35,000 books and extensive archival materials related to English religious history from 1660 to 1920, and
 Extensive institutional records of Methodist organizations and of organizations concerned with pastoral care and theological education.
Margaret A. Pitts, a devout Methodist and supporter of its educational institutions, was responsible for much of the library's growth, providing substantial gifts for new acquisitions. In 1976, the library was named in honor of Pitts and her father, W. I. H. Pitts.

Institutes and Initiatives

Luce International Initiative 
In 2011, Candler School of Theology received a grant from the Henry Luce Foundation to create a model curriculum for internationalism for accredited North American seminaries. The grant has enabled the school to develop faculty and student exchanges, organize seminars and propose new forms of pedagogy in order to build and sustain reciprocal relationships with partner schools abroad and transform its curriculum at home.

Youth Theological Initiative 
In 1993, Dr. Craig Dykstra partnered with Candler School of Theology and Lilly Endowment, Inc. to create the Youth Theological Initiative. Since then, the program has focused on developing theologically-grounded, socially-conscious ministries with youth and young adults, by educating and preparing youth ministers, and leading a summer program for high school students to engage in justice-seeking theological education. In addition, the Initiative conducts research into the theological perspectives of youth.

World Methodist Evangelism Institute 
The World Methodist Evangelism Institute provides opportunities for pastors and lay persons to earn continuing education credits while gaining experience in evangelism in other cultures, offers training in faith-sharing in a non-confrontational approach, and provides opportunities for seminary students to engage with students from other seminaries across the world. Since its founding in 1982, this joint ministry of Candler School of Theology and the World Methodist Council has sponsored 59 major seminars in more than 121 countries around the world.

Certificate in Theological Studies 
The Certificate in Theological Studies program is a collaborative project of the Atlanta Theological Association (ATA) and Arrendale State Prison’s Chaplaincy Department. It is a yearlong program of theological education for incarcerated women, with classes designed and taught by graduate students and faculty from four ATA schools: Candler School of Theology, McAfee School of Theology at Mercer University, the Interdenominational Theological Center and Columbia Theological Seminary.

Candler School of Theology Honor's Day 
A variety of prizes in recognition of vocational and academic achievements by students and staff are awarded annually at the Candler School of Theology Honors Day. Awards for vocational excellence and community service include the Claude H. Thompson Award for work in the area of justice and reconciliation, the Berta and James T. Laney Award in Contextual Education, the Charles Owen Smith Award, the Fellowship Seminarian Award, the Hoyt Hickman Award, the Community Service Award, the John Owen Smith Award, the Ruth Sewell Flowers Award, the Pitts Theology Library Student Research Award, and the Frederick Buechner Prize for Excellence in Preaching.

Awards for academic excellence include the United Methodist Foundation for Christian Higher Education Award, the United Methodist First Career Seminary Award, the United Methodist Scholarship Seminary Award, the Myki Mobley Award, the Nolan B. Harmon Award, the John D. and Alice Slay Award, the Chad Davis Memorial Award, the Boone M. Bowen Award, the Russell E. Richey Award, the G. Ray Jordan Award, and the Academic Excellence Awards.

Buildings and Facilities

Rita Anne Rollins Building (Phase I) 
Completed in 2008, the 65,000-square-foot Rita Anne Rollins Building houses Candler School of Theology classrooms, administrative and faculty offices, community gathering spaces, and Emory's Center for Ethics. The building supports SMART technology and reflects Emory's architectural style and its commitment to sustainability, featuring Italianate design with marble and stucco exteriors and a clay tile roof, as well as LEED silver certification from the U.S. Green Building Council.

In recognition of the support of the O. Wayne Rollins Foundation of Atlanta, Emory University named Phase I of the new Candler School of Theology building in memory of the late Rita Anne Rollins.

Candler School of Theology's Phase II building project was completed in August 2014 and connects the classrooms and administrative offices in the Rita Anne Rollins Building with the Pitts Theology Library, as well as the Wesley Teaching Chapel, new group study rooms for students, a glassed-in atrium and an outdoor plaza.

The building is located at 1531 Dickey Drive.

Candler School of Theology Building (Phase II) 
Candler's Phase II building project is connected to the Rita Anne Rollins Building. Completed in August 2014, the building includes a new home for Pitts Theology Library, an exhibit gallery, an 80-seat lecture hall, the Wesley Teaching Chapel, group study rooms, a glassed-in atrium, an outdoor plaza and office space for Candler's IT staff and Pitts Library staff.

Pitts Theology Library 
For its first 99 years, Pitts Theology Library was housed in the oldest building on the Emory Campus, constructed in 1915. The School of Theology originally occupied the top floor, and the university chapel occupied the Durham Reading Room. The original library for the School of Theology was held in the room that most recently contained the periodical collection.

Pitts Library moved to the Phase II building in 2014. The library now provides an elevator, wireless access, expanded seating options, and enhanced accessibility, as well as proximity to the classrooms and staff offices for the Candler School of Theology.

Cannon Chapel 
Cannon Chapel, named for William R. Cannon, who was dean of Candler School of Theology and later a bishop of the United Methodist Church, was designed by internationally acclaimed architect Paul Rudolph, son of one of Candler School of Theology's first graduates. Ground was broken for the chapel on August 30, 1979, by President Jimmy Carter. The building was consecrated on September 30, 1981.

The building houses the office of the Dean of the Chapel, Candler School of Theology's Office of Worship, a large chapel, meeting space, and academic classrooms. Weekly services including Catholic mass and University Worship take place in this building.

Swanson Art at Candler 
Candler School of Theology holds an extensive collection of the work of Los Angeles artist John August Swanson. Noted for his finely detailed, brilliantly colored paintings and original prints, Swanson has works displayed in some of the world's most prestigious venues, including three museums of the Smithsonian Institution: The National Museum of American History, The Smithsonian American Art Museum and The National Air and Space Museum, The Art Institute of Chicago, London's Tate Gallery and Victoria and Albert Museum, the Vatican Museums’ Collection of Modern Religious Art, and the Bibliothèque Nationale in Paris, among others. Candler's holdings—currently 55 pieces—comprise the largest single collection of Swanson's art in the world.

Affiliated Organizations 
The Aquinas Center of Theology, the Center for the Study of Law and Religion, the Graduate Division of Religion, Methodist Review, Office of Religious Life, and the Practical Matters Journal are among many organizations at Emory or affiliated with the university that are associated with the work and programs of Candler.

Notable Alumni and Faculty

 Nancy Ammerman, Former Candler Faculty; Launched the Baptist Studies program at Candler School of Theology
 Arthur James Armstrong, Elected in 1968 to become the youngest United Methodist Bishop in the United States
 Ed Bacon, Rector emeritus of All Saints Episcopal Church, Pasadena, California
 Immanuel Ben-Dor, Candler professor (1957-1969); First Jewish professor on the Candler Faculty
 Peggy Billings, First female faculty, as visiting professor, in 1973
 Richard E. Blanchard, Sr. 49BD, Methodist pastor; Writer of the Gospel song Fill My Cup Lord
 Roberta C. Bondi, Professor Emeritus of Church History (1978-2006); First woman to hold a tenured faculty position at Candler School of Theology
 William Ragsdale Cannon, Dean of Candler (1953–1968); United Methodist Bishop; Cannon Chapel is named in his honor
 Rebecca Chopp, Candler faculty (1987-); First female provost of Emory (1997); President of Colgate University; President of Swarthmore College
 Fred B. Craddock, Bandy Distinguished Professor of Preaching and New Testament Emeritus
 Susan T. Henry-Crowe 76T, United Methodist denominational leader; Pioneer in multi-faith chaplaincy at institutions of higher learning
 Plato Tracy Durham, First Dean of Candler (1914-1918)
 Nancy Eiesland 91T 95, Associate Professor of Sociology of Religion (1995-2009); Wrote The Disabled God: Toward a Liberatory Theology of Disability, considered a foundational text in disability studies
 Robert M. Franklin, Jr., James T. and Berta R. Laney Professor in Moral Leadership; President Emeritus of Morehouse College (2007-2012)
 Teresa L. Fry Brown, Professor of Homiletics and Director of Black Church Studies; First African American woman to attain the rank of full professor at Candler School of Theology
 James W. Fowler, C.H. Candler Professor Emeritus of Theology and Human Development (1977-2015); Founded Emory University's Center for Ethics
 Charles V. Gerkin, Candler Professor; Created Candler's supervised ministry program, now known as contextual education
 Justo L. González, Former Candler Faculty
 E. Brooks Holifield, Charles Howard Candler Professor of American Church History, Emeritus, AAAS Fellow
 Tricia Hersey, founder of the Nap Ministry
 Earl Gladstone Hunt, Jr., Bishop of The Methodist Church and the United Methodist Church; Previously President of Emory and Henry College
 Mary Vaughn Johnson, First Woman to graduate from Candler School of Theology
 Lewis Bevel Jones III 49T, United Methodist Bishop
 Bernice Albertine King 88T – Daughter of famed African-American civil rights leader, Martin Luther King Jr. and Coretta Scott King; CEO of The King Center
 R. Kevin LaGree, Dean of Candler (1991-1999)
 James T. Laney, Dean of Candler (1969-1977); President of Emory University; Ambassador to Korea
 Jan Love, Dean of Candler (2007–present); First woman to serve as dean of the school
 William Mallard, Candler faculty emeriti; the Bill Mallard Lay Theology Institute at Candler is named in his honor
 Jane Dammen McAuliffe, Former Candler faculty; First scholar of Islam at Candler; President of Bryn Mawr College
 Ian A. McFarland, Robert W. Woodruff Professor of Theology (2019-), Bishop Mack B. and Rose Stokes Chair of Theology (2005-2015)
 Jürgen Moltmann, Visiting professor (1983–1993)
 Carol A. Newsom, Charles Howard Candler Professor of Old Testament; Director of the Graduate Division of Religion; Dead Sea Scrolls scholar, AAAS Fellow
 Doug Moseley, Retired Methodist minister; Former member of the Kentucky State Senate
 David L. Petersen, Franklin N. Parker Professor of Old Testament (faculty emeriti)
 William A. Shelton, Original Candler faculty member; His collection of artifacts from the Middle East became the basis for the Michael C. Carlos Museum
 Andrew Sledd, Original Candler faculty member; Public theologian for racial justice
 Wyatt Aiken Smart, Original Candler faculty member; Emory University's first chaplain
 Luther E. Smith, Jr., Professor Emeritus of Church and Community; Scholar; Advocate for civil and human rights
 Franklin Nutting Parker, Dean of Candler (1919-1937)
 Russell E. Richey, Dean of Candler (2000-2006)
 Don E. Saliers, Theologian-in-Residence (2014-); Retired in 2007 as the William R. Cannon Distinguished Professor of Theology and Worship
 Grant Shockley, First full-time African-American faculty member in 1971
 Mack B. Stokes, Candler Professor (1941-1972); Founding director of Emory's Graduate Division of Religion
 Kiyoshi Tanimoto 40T, Theologian; Humanitarian dedicated to nuclear disarmament
 Henry Burton Trimble, Dean of Candler (1937-1953)
 Otis Turner, First African-American student at Candler; Developed policies for racial justice on behalf of the Presbyterian Church (USA)
 Desmond Tutu, 1984 Nobel Laureate and Anglican archbishop; Past visiting professor of theology (1991; 1998-2000)
 James L. Waits, Dean of Candler (1978-1991)
 James M. Wall 55T, Editor, The Christian Century
 Heather Warren 82T, First woman from Emory University to win a Rhodes scholarship
 Woodie W. White, Bishop-in-Residence; United Methodist Bishop; Civil Rights activist
 Donald Wildmon 65T, Author; Former radio host; Founder and chairman of the American Family Association.

Further reading 
Bowen, Boone M. The Candler School of Theology: Sixty Years of Service (Atlanta: Emory University, 1974).

"Candler School of Theology", in New Georgia Encyclopedia. Retrieved March 13, 2015.

Hauk, Gary S. Religion and Reason Joined: Candler at One Hundred (Atlanta: Emory University, 2014).

Photo gallery

References

External links
Official website
World Methodist Evangelism Institute
Emory University
United Methodist Church General Board of Higher Education and Ministry

 
Seminaries and theological colleges in Georgia (U.S. state)
Universities and colleges affiliated with the United Methodist Church
Educational institutions established in 1914
Methodism in Georgia (U.S. state)
United Methodist seminaries
Protestant seminaries and theological colleges
1914 establishments in Georgia (U.S. state)